State Road 292 (NM 292) is a  state highway in the US state of New Mexico. NM 292's southern terminus is at NM 28 (Avenida de Mesilla) in Mesilla, and its northern terminus is at Interstate 10 (I-10) and U.S. Route 180 (US 180) in Las Cruces. It continues north at its northern terminus as North Motel Boulevard to US 70.

Major intersections

See also

References

292
Transportation in Doña Ana County, New Mexico